Thomas James Allom is an English record producer and sound engineer. His best-known work was in the 1970s and 1980s, working with artists such as Judas Priest, Black Sabbath, Krokus, Loverboy, Def Leppard, Kix and Rough Cutt. Allom is a member of the Music Producers Guild.

Discography

As sound engineer 
Siren/Kevin Coyne
 1969 – Siren featuring Kevin Coyne
Genesis
 1969 – From Genesis to Revelation
Black Sabbath
 1970 – Black Sabbath
 1970 – Paranoid
 1971 – Master of Reality

As producer 
Strawbs
 1973 – Bursting at the Seams
 1974 – Ghosts
 1974 – Hero and Heroine
 1975 – Nomadness

Magna Carta
 1974 – Martin's Cafe

Jack the Lad
 1976 – Jackpot

George Hatcher Band
 1976 – Dry Run
 1977 – Talkin' Turkey
 1977 – Have Band Will Travel EP

Pat Travers
 1978 – Live! Go for What You Know

The Tourists
 1979 – Reality Effect
 1980 – Luminous Basement

Judas Priest
 1979 – Unleashed in the East
 1980 – British Steel
 1981 – Point of Entry
 1982 – Screaming for Vengeance
 1984 – Defenders of the Faith
 1986 – Turbo
 1987 – Priest...Live!
 1988 – Ram It Down
 2009 – A Touch of Evil: Live
 2016 – Battle Cry
 2018 – Firepower

Nantucket
 1980 – Long Way to the Top

Def Leppard
 1980 – On Through the Night

Doc Holliday
 1980 – Doc Holliday
 1981 – Doc Holliday Rides Again

Kix
 1981 – Kix

Whitford/St. Holmes
 1981 – Whitford/St. Holmes

Wolf
 1982 – Head Contact (Rock 'n' Roll)

Cobra
1983 – First Strike

Krokus
 1983 – Headhunter

Y & T
 1984 – In Rock We Trust

Rough Cutt
 1985 – Rough Cutt

Loverboy
 1985 – Lovin' Every Minute of It

Urgent
 1987 – Thinking Out Loud

Jetboy
 1988 – Feel the Shake

The Works
 1989 – From Out of Nowhere

Ashes & Diamonds
 1993 – Heart of an Angel

References 

English record producers
Living people
English audio engineers
Place of birth missing (living people)
Year of birth missing (living people)